Panhandle Eastern Pipe Line Company, LP is a natural gas pipeline in the United States which brings natural gas from the panhandle region of Oklahoma east through the Midwest to supply Indiana and Ohio. It is owned by Panhandle Energy - Southern Union Gas Company - Energy Transfer MLP. The company is headquartered in Houston, Texas. Its FERC code is 28.

References

External links
 Panhandle Energy
 Pipeline Electronic Bulletin Board

Natural gas pipelines in the United States
Natural gas pipelines in Oklahoma
Natural gas pipelines in Indiana
Natural gas pipelines in Ohio